Ibberton is a village and civil parish in the county of Dorset in southern England. The parish covers  extending over the chalk downs that lie to the south and includes the hamlets of Leigh, and Kitford. In the 2011 census the parish had a population of 101, a reduction from 134 in 2001.

The name Ibberton derives from the Old English Ēadbeorht (a personal name), ing and tūn, and means 'estate associated with the man Ēadbeorht'. In 1086 in the Domesday Book it was recorded as Abristetone. Later variants of the name include Ebrictinton and Edbrichton.

The parish church of St Eustace occupies a site that gives far-reaching views northwards over the Blackmore Vale, and Ibberton Hill to the south provides an even loftier vantage point.

Community facilities within the village include a village hall, which is also used by the neighbouring villages of Belchalwell and Woolland, and a cricket ground.

References

External links

 Dorset Online Parish Clerks, Ibberton
 Parish registers
 Ibberton & Belchalwell Village Hall Web Site
 Ibberton Village Book in the Year 2000

Villages in Dorset